Al-Ahli Club of Manama is a Bahraini sports club based in the capital city of Manama. They used to play in the top division in Bahraini football but were relegated to the second division after finishing ninth in the 2011–12 First Division league.  The club also fields players in other sports such as basketball, handball and volleyball. Their home stadium is Al Ahli Stadium, although like all other teams in Bahrain they mainly play on Bahrain National Stadium.

History
Al Ahli (formerly known as Al Nusoor), along with Muharraq Club, is considered to be the pillar of sports in Bahrain. Another club known as Al Tursana (which reached the Bahraini King's Cup in 1969) merged with Al Nusoor to form Al-Ahli Club.

The matches between Al Ahli and Muharraq are known to draw the largest fan attendance in the Bahraini league and is considered to be the Bahrain derby. Today they still are known to have the best youth products on their side, and focus primarily on the youth players to challenge for the league title. Amongst the players that Al Ahli has produced are A'ala Hubail (the Asian Cup 2004 top scorer), Ali Saeed, Mohammed Hubail, and Mohammed Husain.

Achievements
Bahraini Premier League: 5
 1969, 1972, 1977, 1996, 2010

Bahraini Second Division League: 1 
 2015

Bahraini King's Cup: 8
 1960, 1968, 1977, 1982, 1987, 1991, 2001, 2003

Former players

  Mehmed Alispahić 
  Olivier Boumelaha 
  Mohammad Abdel-Haleem 
  Jeremias Carlos David
  Manouchehr Ahmadov
  Lelo Mbele
  Antonio Blakeney

References

External links
 Official site

Football clubs in Bahrain
Association football clubs established in 1936
Organisations based in Manama
1936 establishments in Bahrain
Sport in Manama